Risa H. Wechsler is an American physicist and Professor of Physics at Stanford University and of Particle Physics and Astrophysics at SLAC National Accelerator Laboratory.  She is the director of the Kavli Institute for Particle Astrophysics and Cosmology. She is an Elected Fellow of the American Physical Society since 2017 and a Fellow of the American Association for the Advancement of Science since 2020.

A cited expert in cosmology, large-scale structure, and galaxy formation, her interests are astrophysics and dark matter and energy. She was the Co-Spokesperson of the Dark Energy Spectroscopic Instrument Collaboration until mid-2018 and has played a leading role in the Dark Energy Survey.

She has appeared on the BBC show Horizon: The Mystery of Dark Energy, the Science Channel's Space's Deepest Secrets: Secret History of the Big Bang and on the PBS show Science Bytes: Dark Matters.

In 2019, she collaborated on an exhibit with the artist Oxossi Ayofemi at the Contemporary Jewish Museum in San Francisco.

Education
She earned her S.B. in Physics from Massachusetts Institute of Technology in 1996 and her Ph.D from University of California, Santa Cruz in 2001. She was a NASA Hubble Fellow at the University of Chicago from 2003-2006.

Publications

A list of Wechsler's publications can be found here.

References

Year of birth missing (living people)
Living people
Stanford University faculty
Fellows of the American Physical Society
21st-century American physicists
American cosmologists
American women academics
American women physicists
Women astrophysicists
MIT Department of Physics alumni
University of California, Santa Cruz alumni
21st-century American women scientists